Gabrielle Roth (February 4, 1941 – October 22, 2012) was an American dancer and musician in the world music and trance dance genres, with a special interest in shamanism. She created the 5Rhythms approach to movement in the late 1970s; there are now hundreds of 5Rhythms teachers worldwide who use her approach in their work.

Roth worked at the Kripalu Center for Yoga & Health and at the Omega Institute for Holistic Studies. She founded an experimental theatre company in New York, wrote three books, created over twenty albums of trance dance music with her band The Mirrors, and directed or has been the subject of ten videos.

Early life
Born in San Francisco, Roth was originally inspired to dance, aged seven, by seeing a ballerina through the window of a dance school, deciding that was her vocation. She found a book that showed the ballet positions and started to practice in her bedroom, eventually coming to have ballet lessons. She attended Roman Catholic schools and listened to the music of the local "fundamentalist church".-->

Roth described being inspired by the dance of Spanish gypsy La Chunga and by seeing the Nigerian National Ballet. She trained in traditional dance methods, suffering from anorexia during her teenage years. Roth paid for college education by teaching movement in rehabilitation centres. Following college she lived and worked in Europe for three years, during the mid 1960s. During this time she visited the concentration camps memorials in Germany that she had studied during college.

She injured her knee in a skiing accident in Germany and later again in an African dance class. At 26, she was told that she needed surgery and wouldn't dance again and resigned herself to the prognosis. She entered a depression and later retreated to Big Sur in California, joining a group at the Esalen Institute. She became a masseuse there. She found that her body healed itself through dance, despite what the doctors had said. Gestalt psychiatrist Fritz Perls asked her to teach dance at the Esalen Institute and she set out to find a structure for dance as a transformative process. Out of her work at Esalen she designed the 'Wave' of the 5Rhythms approach, Flowing, Staccato, Chaos, Lyrical, Stillness.

Career 

Roth was a faculty member at The Kripalu Center for Yoga & Health (Stockbridge, Massachusetts) and has taught at the Omega Institute for Holistic Studies (Rhinebeck, New York). She trained for three years with Oscar Ichazo, founder of the Arica School and set up her own experimental theatre company in New York City.

The Moving Center teaches her work through her school in New York; it has certified over 400 5Rhythms teachers worldwide. She taught experimental theatre in New York based on her ecstatic dance approach, 5Rhythms. Roth was music director of the theatre company The Mirrors and has been a member of the Actors Studio. Roth directed theatre productions of Savage Love, by Sam Shepard and Joseph Chaikin, at The Culture Project (Mercer Street, New York City). She founded The Moving Center School in 1977 in New York.

Roth wrote three books: Sweat Your Prayers: Movement as Spiritual Practice, Maps to Ecstasy: Teachings of an Urban Shaman, and Connections: The 5 Threads of Intuitive Wisdom. Sweat Your Prayers, begins with an autobiographical prologue, "God, Sex, & My Body", in which she writes of the contradictions in her personality that led her to dance. She comments, "I loved to work out my body but I hated the mirrors". She notes that she was taught by Catholic nuns "with eyes trained to scan for sin" and that her first dance teacher was "an old woman with frizzy dyed red hair, a funny accent, and a long thin stick" who would beat her whenever she made a mistake, initiating in Roth a severe inferiority complex. In college, she became pregnant. She found her lover insensitive to the news and had an abortion three days later. Roth writes that she felt the importance of privacy to her kind of dance while teaching at Esalen in a room "lined with picture windows". Passers by would stare in during sessions. Roth comments, "this was tragic, as the majority of my students were paralytically self-conscious when it came to moving their bodies." She noticed that her students had difficulty breathing. Her book Sweat Your Prayers ends with her vision of spreading dance across the world, the power of movement "leading us back into the garden [of Eden], back to the earth, whole and healed, spirit and flesh reunited".

With the Mirrors 

Roth performed and recorded as Gabrielle Roth and the Mirrors and produced over 20 albums.

YogaChicago described Jhoom as "pure energy and bliss. Intense rhythms". Hot Indie News described Still Chillin as "without question yoga music" that "lends to an ambient, trance-like, meditative state". Awareness Magazine wrote that the music pulsed, "creating a rhythmic aura that transports the listener", in a way that was perfect for yoga. Michael Riversong wrote of "Silver Desert Cafe" on Tongues that "I always dance when it comes up".

Roth and the Mirrors provided music for Michelle Mahrer's film, Dances of Ecstasy, in which Roth has an acting credit, appearing as herself. The New York Times review noted that "Whirling Dervishes from Turkey, Orisha Priestesses from Nigeria and Brazil, shaman healers from the Kalahari and dancers in a Gabrielle Roth workshop in New York, pulse to the same beat".

5Rhythms 

The 5Rhythms movement system, founded by Roth in the late 1970s, focuses on five body rhythms: flowing, staccato, chaos, lyrical and stillness and is "a way to become conscious through dance". The movement spread worldwide, with 245 registered teachers by 2012. In 2007, Roth founded the non-profit 5Rhythms Reach Out which offered classes in 5Rhythms to various groups, including those suffering from Alzheimer's disease, other dementias, and cancer. The Huffington Post described Roth as "an incredibly influential teacher of meditative dance". Charlotte Macleod, in the London Evening Standard, describes dancing Roth's 5Rhythms as a kind of antidote to life in a large city, and how she was attracted to a dance class by a video of Thom Yorke. The class leaves her "mentally and physically refreshed, and oddly connected to the other dancers." The dance was "a kind of moving meditation" for her. Christine Ottery, in The Guardian, states that "ecstatic dancing has an image problem" and "encompasses everything from large global movements such as 5 Rhythms and Biodanza to local drum'n'dance meet-ups". She suggests that readers may "find 5 Rhythms a good place to start", and does so herself: "Nervously, I stretch and warm my muscles. As the rhythms take off, I shake off my shyness." She dances in different ways, alone or with partners. "My body is expressing itself - it's utter abandonment and a complete high." The 5Rhythms have been the subject of academic study.

Personal life 

Roth was diagnosed with stage four lung cancer in 2009 and died on October 22, 2012, aged 71. Roth's son, Jonathan Horan, is Director of The Moving Center, and Executive Director of Roth's International Institute, 5Rhythms Global.

Works

Books

Music 

Raven Recordings

 Jhoom
 Still Chillin'''
 Bardo (with Boris Grebenshchikov)
 Tribe Refuge (with Boris Grebenshchikov)
 Zone Unknown Stillpoint Tongues Luna Trance Waves Ritual Bones Initiation Totem The Raven Classics – 4-CD boxed set
 Endless Wave Endless Wave 2 Music for Slow Flow Yoga Music for Slow Flow Yoga 2Other producers
 Path: An Ambient Collection (1995) Windham Hill Records
 Conversations With God: A Windham Hill Collection (1997) Windham Hill Records

 Television and video 

 I Dance the Body Electric (1993)
 Secret Egypt (1995) Mystic Fire Video (Directed by Sheldon Rochlin)
 The Spiritual Path to Success (1997) Quest special on PBS (now part of the Quest Life Trilogy, only available in the Quest Wisdom Collection).
 Sukhavati: A Mythic Journey (1997 [music]) [DVD 2005] for Joseph Campbell Foundation and PBS (Produced, Directed, and Edited by Maxine Harris and Sheldon Rochlin).
 The Wave (2001) Sounds True VHS (DVD 2004)
 The Power Wave (2001) Sounds True VHS (DVD 2005)
 The Inner Wave (2001) Sounds True VHS (DVD 2005)
 Ecstatic Dance Trilogy (2004) Sounds True
 Dances of Ecstasy (2003) [featuring: Michelle Mahrer, Nicole Ma and Gabrielle Roth] BBC / Opus Arte
 Open Floor: Dance, Therapy & Transformation (2002) Raven Recording
 The Great Lesson: A New Film About Mind and Body: Featuring Gabrielle Roth

See also

 5Rhythms

References

External links 

 
 

2012 deaths
1941 births
American non-fiction writers
American female dancers
Dancers from California
Deaths from lung cancer in New York (state)
Musicians from San Francisco
Writers from San Francisco
Dance therapists
21st-century American women